Ian Fisher (born 1 March 1961) is a New Zealand former cricketer. He played 21 first-class and 19 List A matches for Auckland and Central Districts between 1982 and 1993.

See also
 List of Auckland representative cricketers

References

External links
 

1961 births
Living people
New Zealand cricketers
Auckland cricketers
Central Districts cricketers
Cricketers from Auckland